The Bughouse Square Debates are an annual event sponsored by the Newberry Library in Chicago. The debates take place across from the Newberry, in Washington Square Park. Soapboxes located throughout the park give a series of scheduled speakers platforms from which they may share their opinions on a variety of issues related to education, labor, sports, religion, technology, national security, and other topics. Every year, a panel of judges presents the champion soapboxer with the Dill Pickle Award, a nod to the Dill Pickle Club, a bohemian gathering place located near the park in the early twentieth century. The first debates organized by the Newberry were in 1986.

Washington Square Park served as a raucous public forum for many of the political radicals and intellectuals who frequented the Dill Pickle Club. "Bughouse" being popular slang for mental health facilities at the time, the word gave the park its nickname and described the fringe viewpoints and the free-flowing discourse on display there. John Drury, describing the scene for the Chicago Daily News in 1921, wrote, "free speech never was freer than in this unique spot on the near north side."

During Bughouse Square's height in the 1920s and 1930s, poets, religionists, and philosophers addressed the crowds, but the mainstays were soapboxers from the revolutionary left, especially from the Industrial Workers of the World. Many of the speakers became legendary and included anarchist Lucy Parsons, Ben Reitman, John Loughman, socialist Frank Midney, feminist-Marxist Martha Biegler, Frederick Wilkesbarr, Herbert Shaw (the "Cosmic Kid"), Kenneth Rexroth in his youth, the Sheridan twins (Jack and Jimmy), famed criminal defense lawyer Julius Lucius Echeles (about Clarence Darrow, and some of his own experiences with judges, justice and defendants); and one-armed "Cholly" Wendorf.

Today the Newberry organizes the debates as a celebration of the legacy of Bughouse Square and of First Amendment rights. Soapbox speakers and hecklers alike are encouraged to join in and voice their opinions on the important topics of the day. The event also includes reenactments of speeches by famous Chicagoans as well as open mic poetry, music, and food vendors.

In addition to the debates, the Newberry honors individuals or organizations with the John Peter Altgeld Freedom of Speech Award. Recipients of the award have included Wendy Kaminer, Chicago journalists Mick Dumke and Ben Joravsky; Students Organizing to Save Our Schools; and Kartemquin Films.

References

Further reading
"Change Bugs an Old Square" by Mike Royko, reprinted in

External links
Studs Terkel on a Soapbox (WTTW Chicago) Trailer, on YouTube.

Industrial Workers of the World in Illinois
Annual events in Illinois